Franz Bistricky (26 July 1914 – 7 May 1975) was an Austrian field handball player who competed in the 1936 Summer Olympics.

He was part of the Austrian field handball team, which won the silver medal. He played two matches.

External links
profile

1914 births
1975 deaths
Austrian male handball players
Olympic handball players of Austria
Field handball players at the 1936 Summer Olympics
Olympic silver medalists for Austria
Olympic medalists in handball
Medalists at the 1936 Summer Olympics